General Arunkumar Shridhar Vaidya  (27 July 1926 – 10 August 1986) was a General Officer in the Indian Army. He served as the 13th Chief of the Army Staff from 1983 to 1986. Following his retirement, he was assassinated by Harjinder Singh Jinda and Sukhdev Singh Sukha in August 1986. This was done in vengeance of Operation Blue Star. General Arun Vaidya commanded this operation.

Family and early life
Vaidya was born in Bombay on 27 July 1926 to a Marathi Chandraseniya Kayastha Prabhu (CKP) family, the son of Shridhar Balkrishna Vaidya CIE, a barrister and sometime district collector of Surat, and his wife Indira. After his early education at Pune, Vaidya studied at Elphinstone High School in Bombay before joining Elphinstone College and later the M. T. B. Arts College at Surat, presumably transferring due to his father's posting there as district collector.

At Elphinstone College, Vaidya joined the 1st Bombay Battalion of the University Training Corps (UTC) and was awarded Best Cadet in 1942 before transferring to the MTB College, where he also joined its UTC and attained the rank of Company Quarter-Master Havildar (CQMH). On 30 March 1944, he joined the Officers' Training School at Belgaum as a cadet. He was selected for the Armoured Corps and underwent further training at Ahmednagar, receiving an emergency commission in the Royal Deccan Horse (later the 9th Deccan Horse) of the British Indian Army on 20 January 1945. Vaidya fought in the Burma Campaign with the 14th Army during the final months of the Second World War, including at the battles of Meiktila and Rangoon.

His wife's name was Bhanu and they had three daughters.

Military career

Early army career
Vaidya received an emergency commission in the Indian Armoured Corps on 20 October 1945, with the service number IEC-11597, and received a regular army commission as a lieutenant on 7 May 1947 (seniority from 20 April 1947), a few months before India's independence.

Post-Independence
In September 1948, Vaidya was involved in Operation Polo as a member of the ad hoc armoured force organised from the Armoured Corps Centre and School. The force captured the Daulatabad Fort, the Ellora Caves area and Parbhani. In 1958, he was selected to attend the Defence Services Staff College, Wellington, having secured a competitive vacancy. He was subsequently appointed brigade major of the 70 Infantry Brigade. He served in this appointment in Ladakh during the Sino-Indian War in 1962.

1965 Indo-Pak war
Vaidya was promoted lieutenant-colonel on 10 June 1965, shortly before war broke out between India and Pakistan that year. He was in command of the Deccan Horse. During the time, he was instrumental in saving the Command Trucks and fleeing Divisional Headquarters through his tanks through an encirclement by Pakistan Army's 6th Armoured Division at the Battle of Chawinda which resulted in destruction of Pakistan's 1st Armoured Division and heavy loss of Pakistani lives. 70 tanks were destroyed of which 38 tanks were decimated by the Deccan Horse. The regiment won 22 gallantry awards and Vaidya as the Commandant was awarded India's second highest military decoration, the Maha Vir Chakra (MVC). He was awarded the MVC in an investiture ceremony at the Rashtrapati Bhavan by the President of India Sarvepalli Radhakrishnan on 21 April 1966.

Maha Vir Chakra Citation
The citation for the Maha Vir Chakra reads as follows:

Between the wars
On 21 July 1969, he was promoted to the rank of Brigadier and appointed Commander of 167 Mountain Brigade. Under him, the brigade conducted operations against the Naga hostiles who were backed by China. Along with the leader, Mowu Angami, most of the hostiles were captured with their weapons and equipment. Vaidya was awarded the Ati Vishisht Seva Medal on 26 January 1970. On 2 November 1970, he was appointed Commandant of the Armoured Corps Centre and School at Ahmednagar.

1971 Indo-Pak war
During the Indo-Pakistani War of 1971, Vaidya was in command of an armored brigade in the Zafarwal sector on the western front. In the Battle of Chakra and Dahira, the hostile terrain was combined with minefields. He crossed through the minefield and moved forward. Thus the entire squadron was able to push through the lane and quickly deploy itself to meet the Pakistan Army's counter-attacks.

During the Battle of Basantar (known as Battle of Barapind in Pakistan) in the same conflict, he displayed skill and leadership in getting his tanks through deep minefields. For this he was awarded a second Maha Vir Chakra (known as the Bar to MVC).

Bar to Maha Vir Chakra Citation
The citation for the bar to the Maha Vir Chakra reads as follows:

Post-war career
On 4 January 1973, Vaidya was promoted to the acting rank of major-general and appointed General Officer Commanding (GOC) the elite 1st Armoured Division. He was confirmed in the substantive rank of major-general on 1 April 1974. He subsequently moved to Army Headquarters as Director Military Operations (DMO). After a stint as DMO, he took over as the Master General of Ordnance at Army HQ.

Vaidya was promoted to lieutenant-general on 25 January 1980, with seniority from 16 August 1978. On 1 July 1980, he was appointed GOC IV Corps. He was also elected as Honorary ADC to the President of India. After a short tenure, he was promoted Army Commander and appointed General Officer Commanding-in-Chief Eastern Command on 3 May 1981.

Chief of Army Staff
On 31 July 1983, Vaidya became the 13th Chief of Army Staff of the Indian Army, taking over from General K.V. Krishna Rao. The appointment was subject to controversy as the senior-most general, Lt Gen S K Sinha was super-ceded. Sinha was the Vice Chief of the Army Staff and was being groomed to take over as the next Chief. With the appointment of Vaidya as the 13th COAS, Sinha resigned in protest.

Operation Blue Star

In 1984, Vaidya designed and supervised Operation Blue Star - a military operation ordered by Indira Gandhi, then Prime Minister of India, against militants commanded by Maj. Gen. Shabeg Singh, a former Officer of the Indian Army, under Jarnail Singh Bhindranwale, Chief of Damdami Taksal, in June 1984 at the Shri Harmandir Sahib complex. Bhindranwale was killed and all militants were cleared out of the gurudwara complex.

He retired on 31 January 1986, one of India's most decorated officers. He had completed over 40 years of service.

Assassination
As the principal organiser of Operation Blue Star, Vaidya was well aware of being a high-profile target for assassins, but never regretted his role, stating in a 1985 interview: "I do not see any difference in taking up arms against a foreign enemy or an enemy from within...one who takes up arms against his own brother-citizens, against his own Constitution and legally-constituted government is enemy enough, deserving the most ruthless punishment." Despite numerous death threats being sent to his offices in the months before his retirement, he remained equally calm about the very real danger to his life: "After seeing two wars I can't run away from danger. If a bullet is destined to get me, it will come with my name written on it."

Following Vaidya's retirement, he took up residence in Pune, India, where he built a three-bedroom bungalow for his retirement. Just six months later, on 10 August 1986, he was shot to death in his white Maruti 800, bearing Registration No. DIB 1437, while driving home from the market on Rajendrasinhji Marg, at around 11:45 a.m. According to police, four reportedly clean-shaven men pulled up alongside the car on motorcycles, with the lead assassin firing three shots into Vaidya through the driver's-side window; the first two bullets penetrated his brain and killed him instantly. His car steered towards a cyclist named Digamber Gaikwad, and the cycle was crushed, though the cyclist escaped unharmed, the general's car stopping in front of a compound wall. A third bullet struck Vaidya in the shoulder, with another striking his wife Bhanumati in the neck. His bodyguard, who was also in the car, was wounded by four bullets in his back and thighs. The bleeding general was carried to the Command Hospital in a passing green matador van, and was declared brought dead. The witnesses who deposed in court said that the assailants were clean shaven, but later in turban and beard in court.

According to Indian intelligence sources, Vaidya had been the number four assassination target on lists of Sikh terrorists and he was one of several people killed in retaliation for Operation Blue Star. Vaidya was cremated in Pune with full military honours; in attendance were his wife, daughters Nita Kochhar, Parijat Belliappa and Tarini Vaidya, Union ministers V.P. Singh, V.N. Gadgil and Arun Singh, the three service chiefs, Governor of Maharashtra Shankar Dayal Sharma and Chief Minister of Maharashtra S.B. Chavan, along with over 50,000 other mourners.

Following the assassination, the Khalistan Commando Force issued a statement declaring that Vaidya had been killed in retaliation for the Golden Temple operation. The assassination shocked India, and security measures for senior military commanders, particularly for those who had taken part in Blue Star, were immediately stepped up. Local anti-Sikh rioting broke out in Pune and Mumbai after Vaidya's assassination; a number of people were stabbed and several Sikh-owned businesses were attacked.

In 1989, Khalistani militant Sukhdev Singh Sukha and Khalistani militant Harjinder Singh Jinda were sentenced to death for the killing. Despite admitting to the killing, they pleaded not-guilty, justifying their actions by stating that Vaidya was "guilty of a serious crime, the punishment for which could only be death". The two were executed on 9 October 1992.

Honours and awards

Dates of rank

Notes

References

1926 births
1986 deaths
1986 murders in India
Military personnel from Maharashtra
Chiefs of Army Staff (India)
Indian generals
Victims of the insurgency in Punjab
Recipients of the Padma Vibhushan in civil service
Recipients of the Maha Vir Chakra
Marathi people
Assassinated Indian people
Assassinated military personnel
People murdered in Maharashtra
Deaths by firearm in India
Victims of Sikh terrorism
People from Alibag
British Indian Army officers
Indian military personnel of World War II
Recipients of the Param Vishisht Seva Medal
Recipients of the Ati Vishisht Seva Medal
Defence Services Staff College alumni